In computing, a hidden folder (sometimes hidden directory) or hidden file is a folder or file which filesystem utilities do not display by default when showing a directory listing.  They are commonly used for storing user preferences or preserving the state of a utility and are frequently created implicitly by using various utilities.  They are not a security mechanism because access is not restricted – usually the intent is simply to not "clutter" the display of the contents of a directory listing with files the user did not directly create.

Unix and Unix-like environments 
In Unix-like operating systems, any file or folder that starts with a dot character (for example), commonly called a dot file or dotfile, is to be treated as hidden – that is, the ls command does not display them unless the -a or -A flags (ls -a or ls -A) are used.

A convention arose of using dotfiles in the user's home directory to store per-user configuration or informational text. Early uses of this were the well-known dotfiles .profile, .login, and .cshrc, which are configuration files for the Bourne shell and C shell and shells compatible with them, and .plan and .project, both used by the finger and name commands. 

Many applications, from bash to desktop environments such as GNOME, now store their per-user configuration this way, but the Unix/Linux freedesktop.org XDG Base Directory Specification aims to migrate user config files from individual dotfiles in $HOME to non-hidden files in the hidden directory $HOME/.config.

Android 
The Android operating system uses empty .nomedia files to tell smartphone apps not to display or include the contents of the folder.  This prevents digital photos and digital music files from being shown in picture galleries or played in MP3 player apps.  This is useful to prevent downloaded voicemail files from playing between the songs in a playlist, and to keep personal photos private while still allowing those in other folders to be shared in person with friends, family, and colleagues.  The .nomedia file has no effect on the filesystem or even the operating system, but instead depends entirely on each individual app to respect the presence of the different files.

GNOME 
In the GNOME desktop environment (as well as all programs written using GLib), filenames listed in a file named .hidden in each directory are also excluded from display. In GNOME's file manager, the keyboard shortcut + enables the display of both kinds of hidden files.

macOS 
In addition to the "dotfile" behaviour, files with the "Invisible" attribute are hidden in Finder, although not in ls. The "Invisible" attribute can be set or cleared using the SetFile command; for example, invoking SetFile -a V jimbo will hide the file jimbo. Starting in Mac OS X Snow Leopard, the chflags command can also be used; for example, chflags hidden jimbo will hide the file jimbo.

DOS and MS Windows 
In DOS systems, file directory entries include a Hidden file attribute which is manipulated using the  command. Using the command line command  dir /ah displays the files with the Hidden attribute.  In addition, there is a System file attribute that can be set on a file, which also causes the file to be hidden in directory listings.  Use the command line command  dir /as to display the files with the System attribute.

Under Windows Explorer, Hidden files and directories are, by default, not displayed - though they are still accessible by entering the full path into the explorer address bar.  System files are displayed, unless they are also hidden.  There are two options that enable the display of hidden files.  The main 'Hidden files and folders' option can be used to turn on the display of hidden files but this won't, on its own, display hidden system files.  A second option, 'Hide protected operating system files' additionally needs to be turned off in order for hidden system files to be shown.  Hidden files are displayed with a slight transparency, so even when they are visible they are visually delineated from non-hidden files.

Under Windows Explorer, the content of a directory can also be hidden just by appending a pre-defined CLSID to the end of the folder name. The directory is still visible, but its content becomes one of the Windows Special Folders. However, the real content of this directory can still be seen using the CLI command dir.

References

External links 
 Bellevue Linux Users Group: 
 Computer Hope: Microsoft DOS  command
 .NOMEDIA file

Computer file systems
Metadata